Galeandra, abbreviated as Gal in horticultural trade, is a genus of 37 known species of orchids native to South America, Central America, the West Indies and Florida.

Species
Species currently accepted as of June 2014:

Galeandra arundinis 
Galeandra badia
Galeandra batemanii
Galeandra baueri
Galeandra beyrichii
Galeandra bicarinata 
Galeandra biloba 
Galeandra blanchetii 
Galeandra camptoceras 
Galeandra carnevaliana 
Galeandra claesii
Galeandra curvifolia 
Galeandra devoniana
Galeandra dives
Galeandra duidensis 
Galeandra graminoides 
Galeandra greenwoodiana 
Galeandra harveyana
Galeandra huebneri 
Galeandra hysterantha 
Galeandra junceaoides 
Galeandra lacustris
Galeandra lagoensis
Galeandra leptoceras 
Galeandra levyae
Galeandra macroplectra 
Galeandra magnicolumna 
Galeandra minax
Galeandra multifoliata 
Galeandra nivalis
Galeandra paraguayensis 
Galeandra pilosocolumna 
Galeandra santarena 
Galeandra schunkii 
Galeandra stangeana
Galeandra styllomisantha
Galeandra xerophila

References 

  (1832) Illustrations of Orchidaceous Plants sub pl. 8. 
  (Eds)  (2009) Genera Orchidacearum Volume 5: Epidendroideae (Part 2): Epidendroideae, 29 ff. Oxford: Oxford University Press.

External links 

 
Catasetinae genera